David Adam Le Batard (also known by the nickname LEBO) (born 19 November 1972) is a Cuban-American graphic and fine artist based in Miami, Florida, best known for murals, live painting and sculpture. He has been described as one of southern Florida's "most recognizable artists", and "almost an institution" in the art world for his wide range of media, projects and locations.

Personal history 
Le Batard was born in New York City in 1972 to Cuban immigrant parents, Gonzalo and Lourdes Le Batard. He was raised in South Florida, where he attended the Chaminade-Madonna College Preparatory School in Hollywood, Florida, then Florida International University. He won the 1990 Silver Knight Award for art in Broward County, Florida, and later judged that competition. He was a lecturer in residence at the International Museum of Cartoon Art while attending Florida International University, which he graduated in 1995.

He is the younger brother of Miami sportswriter Dan Le Batard, who hosts the radio and television program The Dan Le Batard Show with Stugotz. David occasionally makes appearances on his brother's show despite the fact that he has, by his own admission, never willingly attended a sporting event. He also serves as the show's art director, designing television graphics and its studio at the Clevelander Hotel.

Themes and influences 
LeBatard refers to his work as "postmodern cartoon art expressionism". He often depicts musicians and musical metaphors, inspired by street art and Cuban music. His visual style involves "soulful" line-based abstractions against bold flat color backgrounds.

Works, collaborations and commissions
He has also worked in the media of fabric, aircraft exteriors, cruise ship hull artwork, stained glass, furniture (he collaborated with designer Ralh Pucci, among others) and flower shows.  In 2008 he collaborated with an Italian tile manufacturer to design the world's largest mosaic mural in Venice, Italy.

He designed the exterior of Norwegian Getaway.

References 

1972 births
Living people
American people of Cuban descent